The Peacock Throne (Hindustani: Mayūrāsana, Sanskrit: मयूरासन, Urdu: تخت طاؤس, Takht-i Tāvūs) was a famous jewelled throne that was the seat of the emperors of the Mughal Empire in India. It was commissioned in the early 17th century by Emperor Shah Jahan and was located in the Diwan-i-Khas (Hall of Private Audiences, or Ministers' Room) in the Red Fort of Delhi.  It was named after a peacock as two peacocks are shown dancing at its rear.

History 

Shah Jahan ruled in what is considered the Golden Age of the vast Mughal Empire, which covered almost all of the Indian subcontinent. He ruled from the newly constructed capital of Shahjahanabad. The emperor was the focus around which everything else revolved, giving audiences and receiving petitioners. The ruler's court was to be a mirror image of paradise on earth, in the very centre of the empire; and such a ruler would be worthy of a Throne of Solomon (تخت سليمان, Takht-e-Sulaiman) to underscore his position as a just king. Just like Solomon's throne, the Peacock Throne was to be covered in gold and jewels, with steps leading up to it, with the ruler floating above ground and closer to heaven. Said Gilani and his workmen from the imperial goldsmiths' department were commissioned with the construction of this new throne. It took seven years to complete. Large amounts of solid gold, precious stones and pearls were used, creating a masterful piece of Mughal workmanship that was unsurpassed before or after its creation. It was an opulent indulgence that could only be seen by a small number of courtiers, aristocrats, and visiting dignitaries. The throne was, even by Golden Age Mughal standards, supremely extravagant, costing twice as much as the construction of the Taj Mahal.

The appearance of this new throne was in stark contrast to the older throne of Jahangir, a large rectangular slab of engraved black basalt constructed in the early 1600s, used by the father of Shah Jahan.

The new throne was not initially given the name by which it became known. It was simply known as the "Jeweled Throne" or "Ornamented Throne" (Takht-Murassa). It received its name from later historians because of the peacock statues featured on it.

The Peacock Throne was inaugurated in a triumphant ceremony on 22 March 1635, the formal seventh anniversary of Shah Jahan's accession. The date was chosen by astrologers and was doubly auspicious, since it coincided exactly with Eid al-Fitr, the end of Ramadan, and Nowruz, the Persian New Year. The emperor and the court were returning from Kashmir and it was determined that the third day of Nowruz would be the most auspicious day for him to enter the capital and take his seat on the throne.

Muhammad Qudsi, the emperor's favourite poet, was chosen to compose twenty verses that were inscribed in emerald and green enamel on the throne. He praised the matchless skill of the artisans, the "heaven-depleting grandeur" of its gold and jewels, and included the date in the letters of the phrase "the throne of the just king".

Poet Abu-Talib Kalim was given six pieces of gold for each verse in his poem of sixty-three couplets.

The master goldsmith Said Gilani was summoned by the emperor and showered with honours, including with his weight in gold coins and given the title "Peerless Master" (Bibadal Khan). Gilani produced a poem of 134 couplets, filled with chronograms, the first twelve couplets giving the date of the emperor's birth, the following thirty-two the date of his first coronation, then ninety couplets giving the date of the throne's inauguration.

After Shah Jahan's death, his son Aurangzeb, who had the regnal name of Alamgir, ascended the Peacock Throne. Aurangzeb was the last of the strong Mughal emperors. After his death, in 1707, his son Bahadur Shah I reigned from 1707 to 1712. Bahadur Shah I was able to keep the empire stable, by maintaining a relaxed religious policy; however, after his death the empire was in inexorable decline. A period of political instability, military defeats, and court intrigues led to a succession of weak emperors: Jahandar Shah ruled for one year from 1712–1713, Farrukhsiyar from 1713–1719, Rafi ud-Darajat and Shah Jahan II only for a couple of months in 1719. By the time Muhammad Shah came to power, Mughal power was in serious decline and the empire was vulnerable. Nevertheless, under the generous patronage of Muhammad Shah, the court at Delhi became again a beacon of the arts and culture. Administrative reforms could not however stop the later Mughal-Maratha Wars, which greatly sapped the imperial forces. It was only a question of time until forces from neighbouring Persia saw their chance to invade.

Nader Shah's invasion of the Mughal Empire culminated in the Battle of Karnal, on 13 February 1739, and the defeat of Muhammad Shah. Nadir Shah entered Delhi and sacked the city, in the course of which tens of thousands of inhabitants were massacred. Persian troops left Delhi at the beginning of May 1739, taking with them the throne as a war trophy, their haul of treasure amounting to a large reduction in Mughal wealth and an irreplaceable loss of cultural artefacts. Among the known precious stones that Nadir Shah looted were the Akbar Shah, Great Mughal, Great Table, Koh-i-Noor, and Shah diamonds, as well as the Samarian spinel and the Timur ruby. These stones were either part of the Peacock Throne or were in possession of the Mughal emperors. The Akbar Shah Diamond was said to form one of the eyes of a peacock, as did the Koh-i-Noor. The Shah diamond was described by Jean-Baptiste Tavernier as being on the side of the throne. Many of these stones ended up becoming part of the Persian crown jewels and, later, the British crown jewels as a result of Great Britain's colonial expansion into the region.
When Nadir Shah was assassinated by his own officers on 19 June 1747, the throne disappeared, most probably being dismantled or destroyed for its valuables, in the ensuing chaos. One of the unsubstantiated rumours claimed the throne was given to the Ottoman Sultan, although this could have been a minor throne produced in Persia and given as a gift. The Persian emperor Fath-Ali Shah commissioned the Sun Throne to be constructed in the early 19th century. The Sun Throne has a platform in the shape of that of the Peacock Throne. Some rumours claim that parts of the original Peacock Throne were used in its construction, although there is no evidence for that. Over time, the Sun Throne was erroneously referred to as the Peacock Throne, a term that was later appropriated by the West as a metonym for the Persian monarchy. No structural parts proven to be of the original Peacock Throne survived. Only some of the diamonds and precious stones that are attributed to it have survived and have been re-worked.

However, that this stone pedestal does indeed come from the Peacock Throne has not been independently corroborated by scientists and historians.

A replacement throne that closely resembled the original was probably constructed for the Mughal emperor, after the Persian invasion. The throne was located on the eastern side of the Divan-i-Khas, towards the windows. This throne however was also lost, possibly during or after the Indian Rebellion of 1857 and the subsequent looting and partial destruction of the Red Fort by the British. The marble pedestal on which it rested has survived and can still be seen today.

In 1908, the New York Times reported that Caspar Purdon Clarke, Director of the Metropolitan Museum of Art, obtained what was purported to be a marble leg from the pedestal of the throne. Although mentioned in the 1908 annual report, the status of this pedestal leg remains unknown. There is another marble leg in the Victoria and Albert Museum in London. Where exactly these two pedestal legs originate from, and if they are connected to the Peacock Throne at all, remains unclear.

Inspired by the legend of the throne, King Ludwig II of Bavaria installed a romanticised version of it in his Moorish Kiosk in Linderhof Palace, constructed in the 1860s.

Descriptions 

The contemporary descriptions that are known today of Shah Jahan's throne are from the Mughal historians Abdul Hamid Lahori and Inayat Khan, and the French travellers François Bernier and Jean-Baptiste Tavernier. No known painting that would match their descriptions exists of the throne.

By Abdul Hamid Lahori 
Abdul Hamid Lahori (d. 1654) describes, in his Padshahnama, the construction of the throne:

By Inayat Khan 
The following is the account given of the throne in the Shahjahannama of Inayat Khan:

By François Bernier 
The French physician and traveller François Bernier described, in his Travels in the Mogul Empire A.D. 1656-1668, the throne in the Diwan-i-Khas:

By Jean-Baptiste Tavernier 

The French jeweler Jean-Baptiste Tavernier made his sixth voyage to India between 1663 and 1668. It was his great privilege to be invited to visit the court at Delhi by emperor Aurangzeb himself, where he remained as Aurangzeb's guest for two months, from 12 September 1665 to 11 November 1665.

Tavernier was invited so the emperor could inspect the jewels he had brought from the west, with the intent of purchasing them. During this visit, Tavernier not only sold several jewels to the emperor and the emperor's uncle Jafar Khan, but established a close relationship with the emperor that led to a longer stay. Tavernier was invited to stay until the conclusion of the emperor's annual birthday celebrations, during which time he had the opportunity to visit the Red Fort and inspect the Peacock Throne. He was also given the opportunity to inspect the valuable jewels and stones belonging to the emperor, but was not able to see those still kept by Aurangzeb's father Shah Jahan, who was imprisoned at Agra Fort. In January 1666, only few months after Tavernier's stay, Shah Jahan died and Aurangzeb claimed the remaining stones.

Tavernier gives a detailed description of the Peacock Throne in his book Les Six Voyages de J. B. Tavernier, which was published in 1676 in two volumes. The account of the throne appears in Chapter VIII of Volume II, in which he describes the preparations for the emperor's annual birthday festival, and also the magnificence of the court. Tavernier is considered among the least reliable from a conventionally historical perspective.

Tavernier, however, describes seeing the throne in what is probably the Diwan-i-Am. One theory is that the throne was sometimes moved between the two halls, depending on the occasion. Tavernier also describes five other thrones in the Diwan-i-Khas.

Discrepancies between descriptions of Lahori and Tavernier 

The descriptions of Lahori, from before 1648, and Tavernier's, published in 1676, are generally in broad agreement on the most important features of the thrones, such as its rectangular shape, standing on four legs at its corners, the 12 columns on which the canopy rests, and the type of gemstones embedded on the throne, such as balas rubies, emeralds, pearls, diamonds, and other coloured stones. There are however some significant differences between the two descriptions:

 Lahori's account of the throne, based on the language used, could be a description of the projected design. Tavernier's account of the throne seems to be an eye-witness observation during his visit, in 1665, to the Red Fort. It could be that there were differences between the projected and final designs of the throne that Shah Jahān ascended for the first time on 12 March 1635.
 According to Lahori, the throne was to have a length of 3 yards (9 feet) and a breadth of 2½ yards (7½ feet). Tavernier however gives the length at 6 feet and breadth of 4 feet. The height is described by Lahori as 5 yards (15 feet), but Tavernier's account does not mention its total height. Only the height of the four legs at the corners are mentioned, which was about 2 feet.
 Lahori describes the canopy as being supported by 12 emerald columns, Tavernier describes 12 columns that were surrounded by and embedded with rows of pearls, which were round and of fine water, and which weighed from 6 to 10 carats each. He thinks these pearls were in fact the most costly and precious aspect of the throne.
 A major difference is the position of the eponymous peacock statues. Lahori states that on the top of each pillar there were to be two peacocks, thick-set with gems, and between each two peacocks, a tree set with rubies and diamonds, emeralds and pearls. If the reference to "pillar" here means "column" there would be 24 peacocks right round the throne. Tavernier however saw only a single large peacock above the quadrangular-shaped, dome-like canopy, with an elevated tail, embedded with blue sapphires and other coloured stones, the body of the peacock being made of gold inlaid with precious stones, having a large ruby in front of the breast, from which hung a pear-shaped pearl around 60 carats in weight. Apart from the single large peacock, Tavernier's account speaks of a large bouquet, representing many kinds of flowers, made of gold inlaid with precious stones, of the same height as the peacock, situated on either side of the peacock.
 According to Lahori, ascending the throne was by way of three steps, which were also set with jewels of fine water. Tavernier however describes four steps on the longer side of the throne and embedded with the same types of gemstones used on the throne, and with matching designs.

Apart from the significant differences between the two accounts given above, there are several details given in Lahori's account that are not mentioned in Tavernier's, and vice versa.

Lahori's description 
 Lahori's account mentions several historical diamonds that decorated the throne, such as the 186-carat Koh-i-Noor diamond, the 95-carat Akbar Shah diamond, the 88.77-carat Shah diamond and the 83-carat Jahangir diamond, apart from the 352.50-carat Timur Ruby, the third-largest balas ruby in the world. Tavernier makes no mention of these most precious stones. One explanation is that when Tavernier saw the throne in 1665, all these historical diamonds and the balas ruby were in the possession of Shah Jahan, who was under house arrest at the Fort in Agra. Shah Jahan died on 22 January 1666—two months after Tavernier left Delhi, and reached Bengal, during this, his sixth, and last, voyage to India—and his son and successor Aurangzeb was able to claim all these gems. Lahori's descriptions were made during the rule of Shah Jahan, when all the gems were probably incorporated in the throne.
 According to Lahori, a twenty-couplet poem by the poet Muhammad Qudsi praising Shah Jahan in emerald letters was embedded in the throne. Tavernier does not mention this in his account, either because of his inability to read and understand what was written, or because Aurangzeb had ordered its removal.

Tavernier's description 
Tavernier was allowed to closely inspect the throne and its jewels and wrote the most well known detailed description to date.

 In his account, Tavernier gave details of the design in which the balas rubies, emeralds, diamonds, and pearls were arranged on the four horizontal bars connecting the four vertical legs, from which the 12 vertical columns, supporting the canopy, arose. In the middle of each bar, a large cabochon-cut balas ruby was placed, surrounded by four emeralds forming a square cross. Smaller such square crosses were situated on either side of the central large cross, along the length of the bar, but arranged in such a way that while in one square cross a balas ruby occupied the center, surrounded by four emeralds, in the next square cross, an emerald was surrounded by four balas rubies. The emeralds were table-cut and the intervals between the emerald-and-ruby crosses, were covered with diamonds, also table-cut and not exceeding 10 to 12 carats in weight.
 There were three cushions or pillows upon the throne. The one placed behind the emperor's back was large and round; the other two, placed at his sides, were flat. The cushions were also studded with gems.
 Tavernier mentioned some royal standards and weapons that were suspended from the throne, such as a mace, a sword and a round shield, and a bow and quiver with arrows, all studded with gemstones.
 He counted the number of large balas rubies and emeralds on the throne. Accordingly, there were 108 large balas rubies on the throne, all cabochon-cut, the smallest weighing around 100 carats and the largest over 200 carats in weight. He counted 116 large emeralds on the throne, all of excellent colour, but with many flaws (a characteristic feature of emeralds), the smallest weighing around 30 carats and the largest around 60 carats.
 The underside of the canopy was covered with diamonds and pearls, with a fringe of pearls all round.
 On the side of the throne facing the court was suspended a diamond of 80 to 90 carats in weight, with rubies and emeralds surrounding it. When the Emperor was seated on the throne, this suspended arrangement of jewels was in full view in front of him.
 Tavernier then wrote about two large gem-studded royal umbrellas, which were not part of the throne, but were placed on either side of the throne, at a distance of 4 feet from it. The central stems of these umbrellas, 7 to 8 feet long, were covered with diamonds, rubies, and pearls. The cloth of the umbrella was made of red velvet, and embroidered and fringed all round with pearls. The height of these umbrellas might give an indication as to the height of the throne, which was probably of the same height. Thus, the height of the throne would have been around 7 to 10 feet.

Later Peacock Throne 

After Nadir Shah took the original, another throne was made for the Mughal emperor. Along with the Peacock Throne, Nadir had also taken the fabulous Koh-i Noor and Darya-i Noor diamonds to Persia, where some became part of the Persian crown jewels, and others were sold to the Ottomans. The plunder taken by Nadir was so great that he stopped taxation for 3 years. The bottom half of the Peacock Throne might have been converted into the Sun Throne also a part of the Persian crown jewels. Various 19th-century Indian paintings of this later throne exist. It was located in the Diwan-i-Khas and might have been smaller in size than the original. However, the appearance would have been similar, based on either the original plans or from memory and eye-witness accounts. The replacement throne was made out of gold, or was gilded, and was studded with precious and semi-precious stones. Just like the original, it featured 12 columns. The columns carried a Bengali do-chala roof, which was graced with two peacock statues on the two ends, carrying pearl necklaces in their beaks, and two peacocks at the top, also carrying pearl necklaces in their beaks. The two lower peacocks were in the center underneath a flower bouquet made out of jewels, or under a royal umbrella. This throne was protected by a canopy made out of precious and colorful textiles, and gold and silver threads. The canopy was carried by four slender columns or beams made out of metal. Underneath the throne, colorful and precious carpets were laid out.

See also 
 Golden Throne (Mysore)
 Maharaja Ranjit Singh's throne
 Marble Throne
 Naderi Throne
 Sun Throne
 Throne of Jahangir

References

Further reading

External links

—description of the throne and what happened to it.

Mughal Court
Mughal art
Red Fort
Thrones
Individual thrones
1739 in India
Wars involving Afsharid Iran
Islamic metal art
1730s in Iran